Lonely and Blue is an album by jazz vocalist Etta Jones which was recorded in 1962 and released on the Prestige label.

Reception

The Allmusic site awarded the album three stars, stating: "Singer Etta Jones often recalls late-period Billie Holiday and Dinah Washington."

Track listing 
 "I'll Be There" (Howard Cook) – 2:55     
 "In the Dark" (Lil Green) – 2:55     
 "Out in the Cold Again" (Rube Bloom, Ted Koehler) – 3:16     
 "I'm Pulling Through" (Arthur Herzog, Jr., Irene Kitchings) – 3:37     
 "My Gentleman Friend" (Arnold B. Horwitt, Richard Lewine) – 2:20     
 "I Wonder" (Cecil Gant) – 3:20     
 "You Don't Know My Mind" (Clarence Williams) – 3:51     
 "Gee, Baby, Ain't I Good to You" (Andy Razaf, Don Redman) – 3:09     
 "Good-For-Nothin' Joe" (Bloom, Koehler) – 3:50     
 "I Miss You So" (Jimmy Henderson, Sid Robin, Bertha Scott) – 3:26 (orig. by The Cats and the Fiddle)    
 "Trav'lin' Light" (Johnny Mercer, Jimmy Mundy, Trummy Young) – 3:43     
 "But Not for Me" (George Gershwin, Ira Gershwin) – 4:28 Bonus track on CD reissue      
 "If You Are But a Dream" (Nat Bonx, Jack Fulton, Moe Jaffe) – 4:22 Bonus track on CD reissue      
 "Cool Cool Daddy" (Traditional) – 4:50 Bonus track on CD reissue
Recorded at Van Gelder Studio in Englewood Cliffs, New Jersey on April 6, 1962 (tracks 1, 2, 4, 6, 7, 9 & 10), April 13, 1962 (tracks 12–14) and May 4, 1962 (tracks 3, 5, 8 & 11)

Personnel 
Etta Jones – vocals
Gene Ammons (tracks 12–14), Budd Johnson (tracks 3, 5, 8 & 11) – tenor saxophone  
Patti Bown – piano
Wally Richardson – guitar (tracks 1, 2, 4, 6, 7, 9 & 10)
Art Davis (tracks 3, 5, 8 & 11), George Duvivier (tracks 1, 2, 4, 6, 7, 9, 10 & 12–14) – bass 
Walter Perkins (tracks 12–14), Ed Shaughnessy (tracks 1–11) – drums

References 

Etta Jones albums
1962 albums
Prestige Records albums
Albums recorded at Van Gelder Studio
Albums produced by Esmond Edwards